En pièces détachées is an album by the French singer Johnny Hallyday.

Track listing

Deux étrangers ("Brave Strangers") 5:12
Je peux te faire l'amour 4:11
Lady Divine 3:33
Chez madame Lolita 3:55
Excusez-moi de chanter encore du rock'n'roll 2:26
 Monsieur Paul 4:04
Guerre ("Red") 3:53
La nuit crie au secours ("Every Time I Think of You") 3:39
Cette fille-là 3:04
Le blues, ma guitare et moi 5:36

Source: En Pièces Détachées track listing

References

1981 albums
Johnny Hallyday albums
Philips Records albums